The Roman Catholic Diocese of Incheon is a diocese of the Latin Church of the Catholic Church located in Incheon, South Korea. The diocese is suffragan to the Archdiocese of Seoul.

History
On 6 June 1961 Pope John XXIII erected as an Apostolic Vicariate of Incheon.  It was elevated to a diocese the next year on 10 March. The seat is Dapdong Cathedral.

Leadership

Ordinaries

Apostolic Vicars of Inch’on
William John McNaughton, M.M. (1961–1962)

Bishops of Incheon
William John McNaughton, M.M. (1962–2002)
Boniface Choi Ki-San (2002–2016)
John Baptist Jung Shin-chul (2016–present)

Coadjutor Bishops
Boniface Choi Ki-San (1999–2002)

Auxiliary Bishops
John Baptist Jung Shin-chul (2010–2016)

References

Christian organizations established in 1961
Incheon
Incheon
Incheon
Roman Catholic Ecclesiastical Province of Seoul